The Battle of Arles was fought between the Visigoths and a Roman-Hunnic alliance in 425. The Visigoths and the Romans had previously been in peace, but in 425 the Visigothic king Theodoric I broke the peace treaty and invaded Gaul, laying siege to Arles. He was however defeated and driven away by the Romans under the leadership of  Flavius Aetius and their Hunnic allies. Theodoric thereafter made peace again, instead turning his sights on the Vandals in Hispania. Theodoric was finally defeated at Narbonne in 437.

Sources
 

Arles 425
Arles 425
Arles 425
Arles 425